Toine Beukering (born 1958) is a Dutch politician and a member of the Senate. He was originally affiliated to the Forum for Democracy party but switched to JA21.

Beukering was a member of the Royal Dutch Army and took part in peace keeping operations in Burundi and the Ivory Coast. He first entered politics when he was elected to the Provincial Council of South Holland as a member of the FvD party and was subsequently designated as a Senator. In 2020, he defected to the Van Pareren group which later became the Senate faction of the JA21 party.

References 

Living people
1958 births
21st-century Dutch politicians
Royal Netherlands Army personnel
Forum for Democracy (Netherlands) politicians
JA21 politicians
Members of the Senate (Netherlands)